Swardeston is a village four miles (6 km) south of Norwich in Norfolk, England, on high ground above the Tas valley.

History

Its church, dedicated to St Mary the Virgin, has a 15th-century tower, but two arched windows indicate that its origins are Saxon and Norman.

Edith Cavell, the English nurse shot dead by a German firing squad during the First World War, was born in Swardeston in 1865.

Sport

Swardeston Cricket Club
Swardeston hosts a successful cricket team, who have won ECB National Club Twenty20 three times (in 2010, 2016 and 2019) and the ECB National Club Cricket Championship in 2019, when they defeated Nantwich at Lord's by 53 runs. They have also won the East Anglian Premier League seven times, including five consecutive tiles from 2012 to 2016.

Football
In football, Norwich CEYMS of the Anglian Combination also play in the village.

Notes

External links

Swardeston CC 

https://swardestonhistory.webnode.co.uk/ Old Swardeston history site]

 
Villages in Norfolk
Civil parishes in Norfolk